Elaphidion linsleyi is a species of beetle in the family Cerambycidae. It was described by Knull in 1960.

References

linsleyi
Beetles described in 1960